Aline Gubbay (June 20, 1920 – October 21, 2005) was a Canadian photographer, art historian and writer.

Gubbay was the author of four non-fiction books, Montreal's Little Mountain (1979), The Mountain and the River (1981), A Street Called the Main (1989) and A View of Their Own (1998).

Biography
Born in Alexandria, Egypt on June 20, 1920 Gubbay was the daughter of a Turkish mother and a Russian Jewish father From Georgia. In 1924, at the age of four, Gubbay moved with her family to England.

Despite earning a scholarship to the Royal Academy of Dramatic Art in London in 1935, Gabba pursued a career in photography at the urging of her parents. She studied under photographer Germaine Kahn and had a successful career as a portrait photographer in England. Notably, her photograph of Charles de Gaulle was used on a Free France propaganda leaflet.

In 1948 she married Eric Gubbay and they emigrated to Winnipeg. At that time Gubbay abandoned her photography career. In 1956, with her children grown, the Gubbays moved to Montreal and Aline returned to her education, obtaining a degree from McGill University in social work. In 1978 she received her master's degree in art history from Concordia University.

Gubbay wrote for the Westmount Examiner on the topic of local history. She was the author of four non-fiction books, Montreal's Little Mountain (1979), The Mountain and the River (1981), A Street Called the Main (1989) and A View of Their Own (1998).

In 2005 Gubbay died of pancreatic cancer in Montreal.

Publications
Montreal's Little Mountain =: La Petite Montagne: a Portrait of: un Portrait de Westmount. Westmount: Trillium, 1979. Photographs by Gubbay, maps by Sally Hooff. . Translated by Rachel Levy. Text in English and French.
Montréal's Little Mountain: a Portrait of Westmount. Montreal: Optimum, 1985. . Text in English and French.
Montréal: le Fleuve et la Montagne; the Mountain and the River. Montreal: Trillium, 1981. Text and photographs by Gubbay. . Text in English and French.
A Street Called the Main: the Story of Montreal's Boulevard Saint-Laurent. Montreal: Meridian, 1989. .
A View of Their Own: The Story Of Westmount. Montreal: Price-Patterson, 1998. .

References

1920 births
2005 deaths
Deaths from cancer
Egyptian emigrants to the United Kingdom
20th-century Canadian photographers
Canadian women photographers
Canadian people of Turkish descent
Canadian people of Jewish descent
20th-century Canadian women writers
Canadian art historians
Canadian women non-fiction writers
Women art historians
Canadian women historians
20th-century women photographers
British emigrants to Canada